Colias romanovi is a butterfly in the family Pieridae. It is found in the eastern Palearctic realm (Kyrgyzstan west into Tajikistan, Tian Shan, and northern China).

Description
C. romanovi Gr.-Grsh. (26 c) occurs in Southern Fergana. Its golden red colour renders it one of the finest species of the genus. The broad black marginal band of the forewing of the male  is usually without spots, but bears sometimes a row of contiguous ill-defined yellow subapical spots, there being also yellowish submarginal spots on the hindwing; this form is the ab. maculata of dealers (26c). In the female  the ground colour is paler, the slightly yellow-spotted marginal band being broader and the hindwing darkened, the large orange-red middle spot contrasting sharply. The underside is yellow, the proximal portion of the forewing light orange-red, the submarginal spots of the forewing, which are sometimes absent, are blackish, while those of the hindwing are brownish; the forewing bears a large, pale-centred middle spot and the hindwing a large red-edged double spot of the colour of mother-of-pearl.

Subspecies
Colias romanovi romanovi
Colias romanovi seravschana Lukhtanov, 1999

Taxonomy
Accepted as a species by  Josef Grieshuber & Gerardo Lamas

References

External links
Russian insects English text, images

Butterflies described in 1885
romanovi
Butterflies of Asia
Taxa named by Grigory Grum-Grshimailo